Harvey Williams Cushing (April 8, 1869 – October 7, 1939) was an American neurosurgeon, pathologist, writer, and draftsman.  A pioneer of brain surgery, he was the first exclusive neurosurgeon and the first person to describe Cushing's disease. He wrote a biography of physician William Osler in three volumes.

Early life
Harvey Cushing was born in Cleveland, Ohio. His parents were Elizabeth Maria "Betsey M." Williams and Henry Kirke Cushing, a physician whose ancestors came to Hingham, Massachusetts, as Puritans in the 17th century. Harvey was the youngest of ten children.

Education
As a child, Cushing attended the Cleveland Manual Training School, which expanded his interest in science and medicine. The school's emphasis on experimental training and a "physics-focused" approach to education played an important role in influencing Cushing towards a career in medical surgery. The school's manual dexterity training program also contributed to Cushing's future success as a surgeon.

He graduated with an A.B. degree in 1891 from Yale University, where he was a member of Scroll and Key and Delta Kappa Epsilon (Phi chapter). He studied medicine at Harvard Medical School and earned his medical degree in 1895. Cushing completed his internship at Massachusetts General Hospital and then did a residency in surgery under the guidance of pioneering surgeon William Stewart Halsted at the Johns Hopkins Hospital in Baltimore.

He subsequently trained in neurosurgical abroad under Emil Theodor Kocher at Bern and Charles Scott Sherrington at Liverpool.

Medical Career
Dr. Cushing  began his career in private practice in Baltimore. During his time with Kocher, he first encountered the Cushing reflex, which describes the relationship between blood pressure and intracranial pressure. At the age of 32, he was made associate professor of surgery at Johns Hopkins Hospital, and was placed in full charge of cases of surgery of the central nervous system. He wrote numerous monographs on surgery of the brain and spinal column and made important contributions in bacteriology. He conducted (with Kocher) a study of intracerebral pressure and (with Sherrington) contributed much to the localization of the cerebral centers. In Baltimore, he developed the method of operating with local anaesthesia, and his paper on its use in hernia gave him a European reputation. In 1911, he was appointed surgeon-in-chief at the Peter Bent Brigham Hospital in Boston. He became a professor of surgery at the Harvard Medical School starting in 1912.
In 1913, he was made an honorary F.R.C.S. (London). He was elected a Fellow of the American Academy of Arts and Sciences in 1914. In 1915, before the Clinical Congress of Surgeons in Boston, he showed the possibility of influencing stature by operating on the pituitary gland. In 1924, Cushing was awarded the Cameron Prize for Therapeutics of the University of Edinburgh.

First World War
Shortly after the entry of the United States into the First World War, Cushing was commissioned as a major in the U.S. Army Medical Corps on May 5, 1917.  He was director of the U.S. base hospital attached to the British Expeditionary Force in France.  Cushing also served as the head of a surgical unit in a French military hospital outside of Paris.  During his time at the French military hospital, Cushing experimented with the use of electromagnets to extract metallic shrapnel fragments that were lodged within the brain. He was mentioned in a dispatch by Field Marshal Sir Douglas Haig in November 1917.

On June 6, 1918, he was promoted to lieutenant colonel and was assigned as senior consultant in neurological surgery for the American Expeditionary Forces in Europe. He attained the rank of colonel (O-6) on October 23, 1918. In that capacity, he treated Lieutenant Edward Revere Osler, who was fatally wounded during the third battle of Ypres. Lieutenant Osler was the son of Sir William Osler.

Cushing returned to the United States in February 1919 and was discharged on April 9 of the same year.  In recognition of his service during the war, Cushing was invested as a Companion of the Bath by the British government. In 1923 he was awarded the Distinguished Service Medal by the U.S. Army.

Later career
Cushing authored the Pulitzer prize-winning biography, Life of Sir William Osler (London: Oxford University Press, 1925).

From 1933 to 1937, when he retired, he worked at the Yale School of Medicine as Sterling Professor of Neurology.

Cushing died on October 7, 1939, in New Haven, Connecticut, from complications of a myocardial infarction. He was interred at Lake View Cemetery in Cleveland. An autopsy performed on Cushing revealed that his brain harbored a colloid cyst of the third ventricle.

Legacy
In the beginning of the 20th century, Cushing developed many of the basic surgical techniques for operating on the brain.  This established him as one of the foremost leaders and experts in the field.  Under his influence neurosurgery became a new and autonomous surgical discipline.

 He considerably improved the survival of patients after difficult brain operations for intracranial tumors.
 He used X-rays to diagnose brain tumors.
 He used electrical stimuli for study of the human sensory cortex.
 He played a pivotal role in development of the Bovie electrocautery tool with William T. Bovie, a physicist.
 He was the world's leading teacher of neurosurgeons in the first decades of the 20th century.

Arguably, Cushing's greatest contribution came with his introduction to North America of blood pressure measurement.  Upon visiting colleague Scipione Riva-Rocci, an Italian physician, Cushing was astonished by Riva-Rocci's non-invasive way of measuring intra-arterial pressure.  In 1896, Riva-Rocci developed a wall-mounted mercury manometer linked to a balloon-inflated cuff that would measure the pressure needed to compress arterial systolic pressure, i.e. systolic blood pressure measurement.  Riva-Rocci's design was based on a more primitive version developed by French physician Pierre Potain.  Cushing returned to the US with a sample of Riva-Rocci's sphygmomanometer and blood pressure measurement became a vital sign.  The use of the Riva-Rocci sphygmomanometer as a diagnostic tool rapidly spread across the US and western world, a direct contribution by Harvey Cushing.  The device's use continued until Russian physician Nikolai Korotkov included diastolic blood pressure measurement in 1905 (after he discovered the famed "Korotkoff sounds") with his improved sphygmomanometer, which also replaced the mercury manometer with a smaller, round dial manometer.
 Cushing's name is commonly associated with his most famous discovery, Cushing's disease. In 1912 he reported in a study an endocrinological syndrome caused by a malfunction of the pituitary gland which he termed "polyglandular syndrome." He published his findings in 1932 as "The Basophil Adenomas of the Pituitary Body and Their Clinical Manifestations: pituitary Basophilism".

Cushing was also awarded the 1926 Pulitzer Prize for Biography or Autobiography for a book recounting the life of one of the fathers of modern medicine, Sir William Osler. In 1930, Cushing was awarded the Lister Medal for his contributions to surgical science. As part of the award, he delivered the Lister Memorial Lecture at the Royal College of Surgeons of England in July 1930. Cushing was elected to the Royal Swedish Academy of Sciences in 1934, and a Fellow of the Royal Society of London. He served as president of the History of Science Society in 1934. Cushing was also a candidate for the Nobel Prize in Physiology or Medicine, nominated at least 38 times.

The World War II Liberty Ship  was named in his honor.

Cushing General Hospital (now Cushing Memorial Park) in Framingham, Massachusetts, was named for him.

In 1988, the United States Postal Service issued a 45-cent postage stamp in his honor, as part of the Great Americans series.

Cushing developed many surgical instruments that are in use today, most notably Cushing forceps and the Cushing ventricular cannula. The forceps instrument is used to grasp the thick tissues of the scalp during cranial surgery and the cannula is used to enter the brain ventricles for CSF drainage. He also developed a surgical magnet while working with the Harvard Medical Unit in France during World War I to extract shrapnel from the heads of wounded soldiers.

The Harvey Cushing/John Hay Whitney Medical Library at Yale University contains extensive collections in the field of medicine and the history of medicine. Cushing's long-time personal secretary, Madeline Stanton, played a major role in organizing his rare book donations, along with those from John F. Fulton and Arnold C. Klebs, to form the library. In 2005, the library released portions of its collection online, including the Peter Parker Collection which consists of a collection of portrait engravings and 83 mid-19th-century oil paintings rendered by artist Lam Qua of Chinese tumor patients, and a biography of Harvey Cushing by John F. Fulton. In 2010, Yale placed on display Cushing's collection of brain specimens. There is also a collection of his papers at the National Library of Medicine.

Personal life
He married Katharine Stone Crowell (1870–1949), a Cleveland childhood friend, on June 10, 1902. They had five children:

 William Harvey Cushing (1903–1926) (died in an automobile accident while a student at Yale University)
 Mary Benedict "Minnie" Cushing (1906–1978), who married Vincent Astor and later James Whitney Fosburgh;
 Betsey Cushing (1908–1998), who married James Roosevelt and later John Hay Whitney;
 Henry Kirke Cushing (1910–1983), who married Marjorie Estabrook in 1936.
 Barbara "Babe" Cushing (1915–1978), the socialite wife of Stanley Grafton Mortimer and later William S. Paley.

Trained under Cushing

Walter Dandy, the first pediatric neurosurgeon and the developer of pneumoencephalography
Leo M. Davidoff, founder of the Department of Neurological Surgery at the Albert Einstein College of Medicine
Norman Dott
Louise Eisenhardt, Neuropathologist and curator of Cushing's brain tumor registry with more than 2000 specimens.
Wilder Penfield, pioneer neurosurgeon and founder of the Montreal Neurological Institute

Publications

The Pituitary Body and its Disorders (1912)
Tumours of the Nervus Acousticus (1917)
Blood Vessel Tumours of the Brain (1928)
Consecratio Medici and other papers (1928)
From a surgeon's journal, 1915–1918 (1936)
The Medical Career (1940)
A Visit to Le Puy-En-Velay (1945)

See also
 History of medicine
 Timeline of medicine and medical technology

References

External links

 Fulton, John F. Harvey Cushing: A Biography, Charles C. Thomas (Springfield, Illinois), 1946.
 Harvey Williams Cushing Papers in the Yale University Library (MS 160). Manuscripts and Archives, Yale University Library.
 Bliss, Michael. Harvey Cushing: a Life in Surgery, Oxford University Press, 2005. (book review)
 National Academy of Sciences Biographical Memoir
 Harvey Cushing: A Journey Through His Life
Harvey Cushing Fonds. Osler Library of the History of Medicine. McGill University.
 
Collected papers of Harvey Cushing, 1923–1939 (inclusive). Harvard Medical Library, Francis A. Countway Library of Medicine, Boston, Mass.

1869 births
1939 deaths
American biographers
American male biographers
American endocrinologists
American neuroscientists
American science writers
Burials at Lake View Cemetery, Cleveland
Honorary Companions of the Order of the Bath
Harvard Medical School alumni
Harvard Medical School faculty
Johns Hopkins Hospital physicians
American neurosurgeons
Writers from Baltimore
Writers from Boston
Writers from Cleveland
Pulitzer Prize for Biography or Autobiography winners
Foreign Members of the Royal Society
Recipients of the Distinguished Service Medal (US Army)
Yale University alumni
Yale University faculty
United States Army colonels
Members of the Royal Swedish Academy of Sciences
Fellows of the American Academy of Arts and Sciences
United States Army personnel of World War I
United States Army Medical Corps officers
Yale Sterling Professors
Cushing family